Melgar de Fernamental is a municipality and town along the Pisuerga river, in the province of Burgos, Castile and León, Spain. At the 2008 census (INE), it had a population of 1,898.

Former municipalities 
Incorporated into Melgar in the 1970s were the former municipalities of 09349 Santa María Ananúñez from Burgos province and 34162 San Llorente de la Vega from Palencia province, including the following places:
 Melgar.
 San Llorente de la Vega
 Santa María Ananúñez
 Tagarrosa
 Valtierra de Ríopisuerga.

Other municipalities incorporated into Melgar in past centuries were:

 San Zibrián (14th century)
 San Juan (14th century)
 Zorita
 Quintanilla de Muñoroz (16th century)
 Abánades de Abaxo
 Abánades del Medio
 Abánades de Suso (14th century)

History

By the time of Roman Empire, the ancient city of Dessobriga was placed between the municipalities of Melgar de Fernamental, Osorno La Mayor and Osornillo, being its land Melgarese ground today. However, through this area passed multiple Roman roadways. Among them, the most important was the Hispania-Italica, which passed through cities such as Caesaraugusta, Segisamone and Asturicaugusta. The Saldania Roadway started by the river Pisuerga, opposite the town. The Pisuerga Roadway connected the actual municipalities of Herrera de Pisuerga and Astudillo, passing on the fertile plain of the river at the foot of Melgar.

Demography 
Until recently, there was a general population decrease in the municipality. In 2007, 1747 people lived in the main urban area, and the rest in different places which were incorporated into Melgar.

Tourism

Monuments and places of interest:

 Assumption of Our Lady Church
 Town Hall
 Cordon House
 Palazuelos House
 Our Lady of Zorita Hermitage
 Channel of Castile, known as Canal de Castilla

People from Melgar de Fernamental
Luis Martín (1846-1906)- 24th Superior General of the Society of Jesus.
Antonio del Hierro Aparicio (1897-1973)- Bullfighter in decade 1910-20.

Sources

Melgar de Fernamental, Domingo Ortega Gutiérrez, Simancas Ediciones, S.A. Legal deposit VA-500-94 (1994, Valladolid, Spain). Copyright Melgar de Fernamental Council.

References

External links
https://web.archive.org/web/20080401003041/http://www.melekara.com/videomelgar

Municipalities in the Province of Burgos